The 2022–23 Gamma Ethniki is the 40th season since the official establishment of the championship in 1983, and the second after the reestablishment as the 3rd tier of the Greek Football.
The competition is about to start on 13 November 2022, and will be conducted in five groups, in contrast to 2021–22 season, when it was conducted in seven groups. The groups were formed according to geographical criteria. After all games of the five groups are played, the champion of each group qualifies for a playoff round, from which the top four clubs will be promoted to Super League 2.

Group 1

Teams

Standings

Results

Group 2

Teams

Standings

Results

Group 3

Teams

Standings

Results

Group 4

Teams

Standings

Results

Group 5

Teams

Standings

Results

Ranking of 9th-placed teams 

The worst 9th-placed team out of Groups 2, 3, 4, and 5 will be relegated to FCA Championships.

Play-off round 

The five champions from Regular season will play in a double round-robin tournament for four places in 2023–24 Super League Greece 2.

References

Third level Greek football league seasons
3
Greece